Busaba Ahisthan was a Thai, Luk thung singer.

Early life
Busaba Athisthan was born on April 2, 1967, in Thap Khlo District, Phichit Province.

She was made famous by her songs "ท้ารัก" ["Challenge to Love"] and "จอห์นนี่ที่รัก" ["My Dear Johnny"]. She got into the music industry based on recommendations from Cholathi Thanthong and Phanom Nopporn, with her first song "สาวนครชัยศรี" ["Nakhon Chai Si Girl"] recorded in 1984. Later she would be known for fun and energetic songs, such as "ท้่ารัก" [Challenge to Love"], "โอ้โฮบางกอก" ["Whoa Bangkok"], "ชอบคนมีตังค์" ["Liking Rich People"], "นักรบนิรนาม" ["Nameless Warrior"], "ไม่รักอย่าหลอก" ["Don't Lead Me On"] and "จอห์นนี่ที่รัก" ["My Dear Johnny"] which were later re-recorded by Mangpor Chonthicha.

Career 
She joined the Nopporn Silver Gold record label in 1986. Athistan's most popular songs include "Nak Rop Nee Ra Nam", "Jer Nae", "Jhonny Thee Rak", and "Oh! Ho Bangkok".

Busaba Athisthan died on September 18, 2001, 34 years old.

References

1967 births
2001 deaths
Busaba Athisthan
Busaba Athisthan